Mohamed Aït Kaci (in kabyle: Moḥammed Ait Qasi) (born June 20, 1986 in Bordj El Kiffan,  Algiers Province) is a football player who is currently playing as a defender for JS Kabylie in the Algerian league.

Club career
 2006-pres. JS Kabylie

Honours
 Won the Algerian League twice with JS Kabylie in 2006 and 2008

External links
 JS Kabylie Profile
 DZFoot Profile

1986 births
Living people
People from Bordj El Kiffan
Kabyle people
Algerian footballers
JS Kabylie players
Association football defenders
21st-century Algerian people